Vasyl Heorhiyovych Dzharty (June 3, 1958 – August 17, 2011) was a Ukrainian politician. He served as the Prime Minister of Crimea, which is also known as the Chairman of the Crimean Council of Ministers, from March 17, 2010, until his death in August 2011.

Biography

Personal life
Dzharty was born in 1958, in Rozdolne, a village in the Starobesheve district of Donetsk Oblast in what was then the Ukrainian Soviet Socialist Republic. His father was a miner.

He completed his studies at Donetsk Polytechnic Institute. He then obtained a master's degree from Donetsk National Technical University in public administration.

Political career
Dzharty served as the Donetsk Oblast's first deputy governor. He then became Mayor of Makiivka, a city in the Donetsk Oblast of Ukraine. He was elected to the Verkhovna Rada, Ukraine's national parliament, serving during its fifth and sixth sessions as a member of the Party of Regions. From 2006-07, Dzharty served as Ukraine's Minister of Ecology and Natural Resources.

Prime Minister of Crimea
Dzharty became the Prime Minister of Crimea on March 17, 2010, succeeding outgoing Prime Minister Viktor Plakida. The Speaker of the Supreme Council of Crimea, Volodymyr Konstantinov, had nominated Dzharty, a member of the Party of Regions, as Crimea's next prime minister and chairman of the council of ministers. As required by the Ukrainian Constitution, the President of Ukraine, Viktor Yanukovych, had to personally approve of Dzharty's nomination, which he did. 
The Supreme Council of Crimea, which acts as Crimea's parliament, overwhelmingly approved Dzharty's nomination on March 17, 2011. 82 out of the 89 members of the Crimean parliament voted in favor of Dzharty's appointment as Prime Minister. Dzharty simultaneously served as chairman of the Crimean branch of the Party of Regions.

Dzharty was diagnosed with lung cancer in 2010. He sought treatment for the disease in Ukraine, Germany and Russia. Dzharty died from lung cancer in Yalta on August 17, 2011, at the age of 53. He was interred at Kozatske cemetery in the city of Makiivka, Donetsk Oblast, Ukraine, on August 18, 2011. A memorial service was also held in Simferopol. On November 7, 2011 President Viktor Yanukovych appointed Anatolii Mohyliov as his successor as Prime Minister of Crimea.

Accusation in criminal activity
According to the Minister of Internal Affairs Yuriy Lutsenko, in 1990s Dzharty headed the Makiivka gang and was known in a criminal world as "Vasia the Bat" for his proficiency with baseball bat in racketeering.

References

1958 births
2011 deaths
Donetsk National Technical University alumni
Prime Ministers of Crimea
Preservation of natural environment ministers of Ukraine
Fifth convocation members of the Verkhovna Rada
Sixth convocation members of the Verkhovna Rada
Mayors of places in Ukraine
Party of Regions politicians
People from Donetsk Oblast
Deaths from cancer in Ukraine
Deaths from lung cancer
Ukrainian people of Greek descent
Crimean Greeks